Vandenbroucke is a surname. Notable people with the surname include:

Frank Vandenbroucke (cyclist) (1974–2009), Belgian cyclist
Frank Vandenbroucke (politician) (born 1955), Belgian politician
Jan Vandenbroucke (born 1950), Belgian epidemiologist
Jean-Luc Vandenbroucke (born 1955), Belgian cyclist
Rosemary Vandenbroucke (born 1982), Hong Kong singer

See also
 van den Broeck or Vandenbroeck

Dutch-language surnames
Surnames of Belgian origin